Bryantolepis is an extinct genus of arthrodire placoderm from the Early Devonian of Wyoming, Idaho, and Utah. It is known from two species, B. brachycephala, and B. williamsi.

Description 
The genus is known from multiple parts of the skull roof, the suborbital, endocranium, and trunk shield.

Taxonomy 
Bryantolepis is regarded as part of the subfamily Actinolepinae, or within Actinolepidoidei.

References 

Arthrodires
Arthrodire genera